Jesberg is a municipality in the Schwalm-Eder district in Hesse, Germany.

Geography

Location
Jesberg lies from 210 to 675 m high in the Gilsa river valley east-southeast of the Wüstegarten, which at 675 m above sea level is both the Kellerwald range's and the Schwalm-Eder district's highest peak. The community can be reached by Federal Highway (Bundesstraße) B 3.

Constituent communities
Jesberg consists of the following centres:
 Jesberg
 Densberg
 Hundshausen
 Elnrode-Strang
 Reptich

History

The Burg Jesberg, a castle built by the noble family of Linsingen in 1241, was later sold to the Archbishopric of Mainz, and along with Naumburg and Fritzlar was one of the Archbishops' main bases in the struggle against the Landgraves of Hesse. In 1723, the Prinzessingarten — Princess's Garden — near Jesberg was built in what is now the Jesberg State Forest. It can still be seen, along with its centrepiece, the Prinzessingarten-Eiche, a big oaktree, although nowadays, little of the actual garden is still preserved.

The small Baroque stately home was built by Maximilian von Hessen, Landgrave Karl von Hessen-Kassel's son — whose four daughters also inspired the Princess's Garden — on the lands near the Treisbach (brook) in the early 18th century.

On 9 June 1922, the historian Hugo Brunner died in Jesberg.

Politics

As of the municipal elections on 26 March 2006, seats on municipal council are apportioned thus:
 SPD 8 seats
 CDU 5 seats
 UWG 1 seat
 Greens 1 seat
Note: UWG is a citizens'/voters' coalition.

Public institutions
There are a primary school and a library.

Sport and leisure facilities
The community has a forest lore path, a campsite, a leisure centre, two barbecue areas with barbecue huts, a heated outdoor swimming pool, a sporting ground, a wading pool, five children's playgrounds, three tennis courts, a soccer pitch, two minigolf courses and skittle alleys.

References

External links

 Jesberg

Schwalm-Eder-Kreis